The Golden Foot award is an international football award, given to players who stand out for their athletic achievements (both as individuals and team players) and for their personality. The award is only given to active players of at least 28 years of age, and can only be won once.

Ten nominees are chosen by a panel of international journalists based on the criteria that they are at least 28 years of age and still playing. Out of this list, the winner is selected by an online poll, where anyone can vote. The winner of the award leaves a permanent mould of his footprints on "The Champions Promenade", on the seafront of the Principality of Monaco.

Since 2009, there has been a charity auction accompanying the Golden Foot event. The auction is held during the gala evening at the Hôtel de Paris Monte-Carlo, and raises funds for fighting AIDS.

Award winners

By country

By club

Women's Golden Foot 
An equivalent award for women's football was assigned from 2022 onwards.

Award legends

Total by country

Golden Foot Prestige Award 
A Prestige Award was given from 2020 onwards.

References

External links

The Golden Foot official site

Awards established in 2003
Association football trophies and awards
Football in Monaco